Xinjiang University (XJU) is one of the major universities in the Xinjiang Uyghur Autonomous Region, People's Republic of China and is a national key university. Established in 1924 in Ürümqi, Xinjiang University is a comprehensive university with the highest academic level in Xinjiang, under Double First Class University Plan and former Project 211. It is a Chinese state Class B Double First Class University identified by the Ministry of Education.

Establishment and location 
In 1924, Xinjiang Russian and Law School was founded, which is known as the former school of Xinjiang University. In 1935, it was converted to Xinjiang College. Xinjiang University was named in 1960; it is in the southern part of Ürümqi. Among its prominent leaders was Du Zhongyuan, who was executed in 1943 on suspicion of being subversive.

It is a national key comprehensive university with students from various ethnic groups. It is one of two in Xinjiang entering the national “211 Project.” On December 30, 2000, the former Xinjiang University and Xinjiang Engineering Institute merged into a new Xinjiang University. In the past 78 years, it has seen 65,000 students graduate.

Colleges 
Xinjiang University comprises fourteen schools, which has courses and branches of study ranging from science, engineering, law and economics to management, the arts and history. A new major in intellectual property was created in 2013. XJU has three campuses: the Main Campus, the North Campus and the South Campus.

Academics 
There are three Ph.D. programs, 46 Masters’ programs and 75 undergraduate majors. The university has research institutions in these areas of study:
 Economics
 Arid Ecology
 Math Theory
 Demography
 Applied Chemistry
 Central Asian Culture
 Altaic Study
 Architectural Design

The Minorities Folklore Research Center at Xinjiang University was founded by Rahile Dawut.

Rankings and reputation 
In 2021, Xinjiang University was ranked 762th by SCImago Institutions Rankings among research universities around the world. The 2021 CWTS Leiden Ranking ranked XJU at 887th in the world based on their publications for the period 2016–2019. The Nature Index ranked XJU among the top 1000 leading research institutions globally for the high quality of research publications in natural science based on the institution outputs from May 2020 to April 2021.

Asteroid 
Asteroid 192450 Xinjiangdaxue was named in honor of the university. The official  was published by the Minor Planet Center on 25 September 2018.

Notable alumni 

 Tashpolat Tiyip
 Migiti Hudabyer
 Uzur Slam
 Abu Krem
 Abdullah Abbas
 Su Bai·Anabe
 Muha Baite Haasmu
 Xia Xi
 Pan Xiaoling
 Nur Beckley
 Zhou Ji
 Yang Song
 Sima Yi Tili Valdi
 Yang Gang
 Alken Tunia
 Japar Abbbra
 Esherty Krimubai
 Abdullah Abdul Ghiti
 Ibrahim Abdullah
 Nurchari
 Wang Huaiyu
 Xiong Huiyin
 Li Wei
 Fu Qiang
 Nurlan Abuman
 Hou Changan
 Jia Chengzao

Notable faculty 

 Rahile Dawut
 Du Zhongyuan
 Tashpolat Tiyip
 Ibrahim Muti'i
 Wushour Silamu

See also 
 List of universities in Xinjiang
 List of universities in China

References

External links 
 
  campus forum
 Xinjiang University

 
Universities and colleges in Xinjiang
Educational institutions established in 1924
Education in Ürümqi
1924 establishments in China